Union Sportive Medinat Bel Abbès, known as USM Bel Abbès or simply USMBA for short, is an Algerian football club located in Sidi Bel Abbès, Algeria, that was founded in 1933 and its colors are green and red. Their home stadium, 24 February 1956 Stadium, has a capacity of 45,000 spectators. The club is currently playing in the Inter-Régions Division.

History
The team was founded on 7 February 1933 under the name of Union Sportive Musulmane de Bel Abbès. It was one of the great teams in the French colonial period. Between 1977 and 1987, the club was parrained by ENIE, an electronic national society and was named Electronique Sari Madinat Bel Abbès (ESMBA).

On April 27, 2012, in the last round of the 2011-12 Algerian Ligue Professionnelle 2, USM Bel-Abbès beat USM Annaba 3–0 to finish third and win promotion to the Algerian Ligue Professionnelle 1, returning to the top flight after a 19-year absence. However the team return one year after in the second division but one year after again in 2014, they returned to the top division.

Previous Logos

Grounds

The club used to play at the Stade des trois frères Amarouch. Since 1981, the club plays at the 24 February 1956 Stadium which has a capacity of 45,000 spectators.

Players

Algerian teams are limited to two foreign players. The squad list includes only the principal nationality of each player;

Current squad

Personnel

Current technical staff

Managers
  Larbi Benbarek (1957 – 1958)
 ...
  Fethi Benkabou (20??–July 1, 2012)
  Fouad Bouali (July 23, 2012 – Oct 30, 2012)
  Abdelkader Yaïche (Nov 14, 2012 – Jan 3, 2013)
  Mokhtar Assas (Jan 18, 2013 – May 12, 2013)
  Zouaoui Zitouni (interim) (May 13, 2013 – June 30, 2013)
  Abdelkrim Bira (July 1, 2013 – June 30, 2014)
  Jean-Guy Wallemme (July 1, 2014–15)

Honours

Domestic competitions
Algerian Ligue 2
Winners (6): 1966, 1978, 1980, 1988, 1993, 2013–14.

Algerian Cup
Winners (2): 1990–91, 2017–18.

Algerian Super Cup
Winner (1): 2018.

Regional competitions
North African Cup
Runners-up (1): 1956

Performance in CAF competitions
CAF Confederation Cup: 1 appearance
2018–19 – First round

African Cup Winners' Cup: 1 appearance
1992 – Second Round

Notes and references

Notes

References

External links

 
Football clubs in Algeria
Association football clubs established in 1933
USM Bel Abbes
Algerian Ligue Professionnelle 1 clubs
1933 establishments in Algeria
Sports clubs in Algeria